Santos León Herrera (May 21, 1874, San José – May 8, 1950, San José) was interim president of Costa Rica for 18 days during the country's 1948 civil war, serving from April 20 - May 8 of that year. He also previously served as vice president of the country, as part of the Teodoro Picado Michalski administration of 1944–1948. Before that, he served as interior minister from 1932–1936.

References

1874 births
1950 deaths
People from San José, Costa Rica
Presidents of Costa Rica
Vice presidents of Costa Rica